Cherry Boom was an all-female Taiwanese alternative rock band formed by four students of Fu-Jen Catholic University, a university also previously attended by Taiwanese pop singer Jolin Tsai and pop band F.I.R. vocalist Faye Zhan. In 2006, Cherry Boom released their debut album My Dear Prince. Later in 2007, they released their second album, Goody-Goody. The band disbanded after the release of their third album.

Members
 Zha Jiawen (查家雯) or Lena Cha, stage name Zhazha (查查), vocalist
 Liao Yijia (廖宜佳), stage name Gua (瓜), guitarist
 Xu Ruoqian (許若倩), stage name Xiaoqian (小倩), bass player
 Feng Kangtian (馮康恬), stage name Datian (大恬), drummer
 'Eva Abou Samra & Nancy Asmar – Back up singers (大恬)

Post Cherry Boom

After Cherry Boom disbanded, Lena Cha started her solo project Astro Bunny (原子邦妮) with bassist/producer Jay Cheng (程杰). Astro Bunny performed their first concert on 13 June 2012, at the Riverside Cafe (河岸留言) in Taipei and released their debut five-track EP "What If There’s No Tomorrow" the same month. In an interview with the Taipei Times'', Cha said, "We named the group 'bunny' because I love bunnies and I forced him to like them too," Cha laughed. "I picked the word "astro" because I'm an anime and computer game geek".

Discography

Albums

References

Taiwanese rock music groups
Fu Jen Catholic University alumni
All-female bands